Bart van der Leck (26 November 1876, Utrecht – 13 November 1958, Blaricum) was a Dutch painter, designer, and ceramicist. With Theo van Doesburg and Piet Mondrian he founded the De Stijl art movement.

Son of a house painter, he started his career learning how to make stained glass in a shop in Utrecht. An example of his later stained glass work is in the Kröller-Müller Museum in Hoge Veluwe, Netherlands.

After having met Mondrian and van Doesburg and having founded the Stijl movement with them, his style became completely abstract, as did Mondrian's.  But after disagreements with Mondrian his abstract style became based on representational images. His painting Triptych is an example, in which he transformed sketches of a mine in Spain into seemingly abstract shapes.

In 1919-1920 he created the interior design for St Hubertus Hunting Lodge, in the Hoge Veluwe estate.  The hunting lodge was designed by Hendrik Petrus Berlage. In 1930, he was commissioned by Jo de Leeuw, owner of the prestigious Dutch department store Metz & Co. to design interiors, window packaging, branding and advertising. For these print materials van der Leck developed a rectilinear, geometrically constructed alphabet. In 1941, he designed a typeface based on this alphabet for the avant garde magazine Flax. Architype van der Leck, a digital revival of that face by David Quary and Freda Sack of The Foundry, was released in 1994.

Bart van der Leck claimed to be the father of the avant-garde movement.  In his own words he said: "Mondrian came to my place one day with Doesburg, whom I had never seen before. When Doesburg noticed an abstract painting right on the easel, he exclaimed: 'If that is to be the painting of the future, may I be hanged right now!' Well, a few months later, he was painting in precisely that manner. That's the sort of person Doesburg was. No ideas of his own. And a cheat in bargain..."

Public collections
Among the public collections holding works by the artist are:
 Museum de Fundatie, Zwolle, The Netherlands
 Kröller-Müller Museum

References

Haley, Allen. Type: Hot Designers Make Cool Fonts. Rockport Publishers Inc, Gloucester; 1998. 
Hoek, Els, Marleen Blokhuis, Ingrid Goovaerts, Natalie Kamphuys, et al. Theo van Doesburg: Oeuvre Catalogus. Centraal Museum: 2000. .
Toos van Kooten (ed.). Bart van der Leck. Rijksmuseum Kröller-Müller, Otterlo, 1994 (in Dutch).

External links

Short biography at Codart
 Longer biography at Instituut voor Nederlandse Geschiedenis
Works in the Kroller-Muller Museum, Otterlo.

Abstract painters
Modern painters
1876 births
1958 deaths
De Stijl
Dutch male painters
Artists from Utrecht
20th-century Dutch artists
20th-century Dutch painters
20th-century Dutch male artists